"Anything Goes" is a song recorded by American country music duo Florida Georgia Line.  It was released to radio on June 15, 2015 as the fourth single from their second studio album, of the same name.  The song was written by Felix McTeigue, Chris Tompkins and Craig Wiseman.

Critical reception
Billy Dukes of Taste of Country reviewed the single favorably, saying that "By freeing themselves of the shackles of what is or isn't 'real' country music, this duo is able to fall into rhymes and metaphors that set their sound apart as much as their in-your-face production style...Sonically, the song is very similar to many (but not all) of FGL's previous hits...a closer listen reveals an incredibly refined sonic landscape."

Commercial performance
The song first entered the Billboard Country Airplay at number 50 on chart dated June 27, 2015, and peaked at number 3 on the chart on October 31, 2015.  The song also peaked at number 6 on the Hot Country Songs chart, making it the duo's first single to not reach number one on either chart, although it did reach number one on the Canadian Country Chart. The song has sold 430,000 copies in the US as of November 2015. It was certified Platinum by the RIAA on September 23, 2016.

Music video
The music video was directed by Shaun Silva and premiered in June 2015. It consists entirely of footage from the duo's 2015 Anything Goes tour, their first as a headliner.

Charts

Year-end charts

Certifications

References 

2014 songs
2015 singles
Florida Georgia Line songs
Republic Nashville singles
Songs written by Craig Wiseman
Songs written by Chris Tompkins
Song recordings produced by Joey Moi
Music videos directed by Shaun Silva
Republic Records singles
Songs written by Felix McTeigue